Star Academy is a French reality television. It was produced by the Dutch company Endemol. It consists of a contest of young singers. It spawned an equally successful show in Canada called Star Académie.  It was broadcast on TF1 (2001–2008 and 2022) and NRJ 12 (2012). At the end of each season, selected contestants would go on tour around France, Morocco, Switzerland, Belgium, Tunisia, and other French-speaking countries.

The contestants stay in the Dammarie-lès-Lys's Vives-Eaux castle.

The reality show is hosted by Nikos Aliagas and featured guest stars such as Mariah Carey, Madonna, Britney Spears, Beyoncé, Rihanna, Katy Perry, Jonas Brothers, Miley Cyrus, Celine Dion, The Corrs, Texas, Simple Plan, Moby, Tina Arena, Nelly Furtado, Tokio Hotel, Anastacia, Alicia Keys, Craig David, 50 Cent, will.i.am, Destiny's Child, James Blunt, Sean Combs, Sting, David Guetta, Lenny Kravitz, Janet Jackson, Liza Minnelli, Phil Collins, Laura Pausini, Kylie Minogue, Dannii Minogue, Tina Turner, Andrea Bocelli, Charles Aznavour, Hélène Ségara, Lorie Pester, Peter Kingsbery, Lara Fabian, Shania Twain, Avril Lavigne, Alizée, Johnny Hallyday, Paul Anka, Lionel Richie, Alanis Morissette, Ray Charles, Stevie Wonder, Elton John, Bee Gees, and Ricky Martin.

In 2012, Star Academy was cancelled again after only one season, in order for TF1 to focus on The Voice: la plus belle voix.

In October 2022, Star Academy received a reboot after ten years with thirteen new contestants taking part in the programme. Nikos Aliagas again hosted the series which returned to the Vives-Eaux castle. British singer Robbie Williams was named the godfather of the show.

Star Academy seasons
The contestants are classed in order.

Season 1
 Jenifer Bartoli (winner) - participated in the Star Academy Tour, released debut album Jenifer and follow-up Le Passage. Also released live CD & DVD Jenifer fait son live.
 Mario Barravecchia (finalist) - participated in the Star Academy Tour
 Jean-Pascal Lacoste (semi-finalist) - participated in the Star Academy Tour
 Carine Haddadou (semi-finalist)
 Olivia Ruiz (semi-finalist) - participated in the Star Academy Tour, released debut album J'aime pas l'amour in 2003 and follow-up album La Femme Chocolat in 2005.
 Jessica Marquez  - participated in the Star Academy Tour
 Patrice Maktav - participated in the Star Academy Tour
 Djalil Amine - participated in the Star Academy Tour
 François Roure - participated in the Star Academy Tour
 Cécile Boutry
 Sidonie Koch
 Grégory Gulli - participated in the Star Academy Tour
 Stéphane Bosmans
 Amandine Bisqueret
 Khalifa M'Baye
 Catherine

Season 1 was won in 2001 by Jenifer Bartoli from Nice, who has become one of France's best-loved new female singers since then. Second studio album Le Passage has songwriting contributions from Calogero and Benoît Poher from Kyo. Later she released two other studio albums, Lunatic and Apelle-moi Jen.

Carine and Mario, along with series 2 contestants Anne-Laure and Houcine and series 5 contestants Pierre and Alexia make up the cast of a new comedie-musicale in France "Salut Joe" which features the songs of legendary star Joe Dassin.

Olivia Ruiz has enjoyed critical and commercial success with her album La Femme Chocolat.

Season 2
 Nolwenn Leroy (winner) - participated in the Star Academy Tour, released debut album Nolwenn and follow-up Histoires Naturelles. Also released live CD & DVD Histoires Naturelles Tour.
 Houcine Camara (finalist) - participated in the Star Academy Tour
 Emma Daumas (semi-finalist) - participated in the Star Academy Tour
 Georges-Alain Jones - (semi-finalist) participated in the Star Academy Tour
 Aurélie Konaté - participated in the Star Academy Tour
 Jérémy Chatelain - participated in the Star Academy Tour
 Anne-Laure Sibon - participated in the Star Academy Tour
 Fabien Fasake - participated in the Star Academy Tour
 Alexandre Balduzzi - participated in the Star Academy Tour
 Isabelle Lem
 Eva Chemouni
 Rudy Carvalho
 Philip Miro
 Nazim
 Florence
 Stéphanie Hansen

Season 2 of Star Academy launched some singers with successful solo careers - winner Nolwenn but also Emma, who reinvented herself as France's answer to Avril Lavigne; singer, songwriter and producer Jérémy Chatelain who married Alizée; singer-songwriter Georges-Alain Jones; Aurelie Konate who appeared in the comedie-musicale Belles belles belles based on the music of Claude François.

Season 3
 Élodie Frégé (winner) - participated in the Star Academy Tour and released debut CD Elodie Frégé early in 2004 and 3 others in 2006, 2007 and 2010.
 Michal (finalist) - participated in the Star Academy Tour
 Sofia Essaïdi (semi-finalist) - participated in the Star Academy Tour and released debut CD Mon cabaret in 2005.
 Patxi Garat (semi-finalist) - participated in the Star Academy Tour
 Morganne Matis - participated in the Star Academy Tour and released debut cd Une fille De L'ere in 2006
 Lukas Delcourt - participated in the Star Academy Tour - appeared in French drama series Sous le soleil.
 Pierre Bouley - participated in the Star Academy Tour and member of Premix.
 Romain Billard - participated in the Star Academy Tour and member of Premix
 Amina El Bennouni
 Stéphanie Dalmasso - appeared in French series Père et Maire.
 Edouard Algayon - participated in the Star Academy Tour (as guitarist), formed the trio Premix with Pierre and Romain, released CD Chambre 1512 which included single "Oui ou Non". Premix split amicably in late 2005.
 Anne Thibault
 Valérie Deniz De Boccard
 Marjorie Condoris
 Michaël Sapience
 Icaro Da Silva

After the highly successful season 2, much was expected of season 3 and the favourites were named at the beginning: Sofia and Michal.  As it turned out, both of them made their respective male/female semi finals, joined by Elodie and Patxi respectively. Elodie ended up making it to the finals, where she beat Polish contestant Michal and become the winner of Star Academy 3.

Michal will return to the music scene in France in 2007 with his second album All Alone with my Gueule. Sofia ended up releasing her own album Mon cabaret in 2005.

Season 4
 Grégory Lemarchal (winner) - participated in the Star Academy Tour
 Lucie Bernardoni (finalist) - participated in the Star Academy Tour
 Hoda Nekra (semi-finalist) - participated in the Star Academy Tour
 Mathieu Johann (semi-finalist) - participated in the Star Academy Tour
 Sofiane Tadjine-Lambert- participated in the Star Academy Tour
 Sandy François - participated in the Star Academy Tour
 John Eyzen - participated in the Star Academy Tour - came to play the role of Mercutio in the Asia Tour of Roméo et Juliette, de la Haine à l'Amour
 Francesca Antoniotti
 Harlem Parmentier - participated in the Star Academy Tour
 Enrique Toyos
 Radia Bensarsa - participated in the Star Academy Tour
 Morgan Auger
 Tina Gardinier
 Karima
 Sebastien Degut
 Emilie Ducrot
 Gauthier Roubichou
 Lennie

Season 4 winner Grégory Lemarchal became the first male winner of Star Academy in France. He released his debut single "Écris l'histoire" and debut album Je deviens moi in France in 2005. Grégory also enjoyed success in 2006 with "Même si", a bilingual duet with Lucie Silvas of her song "What You're Made Of".

On April 30, 2007, Grégory Lemarchal died of complications due to cystic fibrosis while waiting for a lung transplant.

Season 5
 Magalie Vaé (Winner - Also participated in the Star Academy Tour)
 Jérémy Amelin (Finalist - Also participated in the Star Academy Tour)
 Pascal Maunoury (Semi-Finalist - Also participated in the Star Academy Tour)
 Ely Breton (Semi-Finalist - Also participated in the Star Academy Tour)
 Emilie Minatchy (Semi-Finalist - Also participated in the Star Academy Tour)
 Alexia Palombo (Also participated in the Star Academy Tour)
 Jean-Luc Guizonne (Also participated in the Star Academy Tour)
 Maud Verdeyen (Also participated in the Star Academy Tour)
 Pierre Frischeteau (Also participated in the Star Academy Tour)
 Arno Demessine(Also participated in the Star Academy Tour)
 Grégoire Bourdin
 Laure Ruhland
 Jill Vandermeulen
 Chloé Boucaud
 Mickael Tabury
 Moïse Quaresma
 Nassim & Neissa Parize

Season 5 was notable for the return of some familiar faces - season 1 and 2 directrice Alexia Laroche-Joubert returned in the same role, after which the role was filled in season 3 by Nathalie Andre, and in season 4 by Gerard Louvin.  Also back was Raphaelle Ricci as prof of scenic expression.

Despite an expanded age limit on participants, there was only one noticeably participant - Jérémy Amelin (18).  His popularity grew over the series and he eventually reached the finale where he faced, and lost to, Magalie Vaé.

Among the female contestants the early favourite was Emilie, a violinist who originated from the island of Reunion.  However, her popularity with the jury was seemingly not shared by the public.  In the female semi final she and fellow student Ely were voted out in favour of Magalie, who had attracted much attention in France because, unlike previous Star Academy participants, she was overweight.

In the end, Magalie triumphed on 16.12.2005 and became the fifth Star Academy winner in France.  Magalie sold the least CDs by a series winner compared to previous winners Jenifer and Nolwenn.  This raises the question of whether the judging should be 100% in the hands of the voting public.

Season 6

Cyril Cinélu (Winner-Final week 16)
Dominique Fidanza (Second Place-Final week 16)
Marina (Eliminated week 15 semi-final)
Cynthia Brown (Eliminated week 15 semi-final)
Ludovic (Eliminated week 14)
Jean-Charles (Eliminated week 13)
Brice (Eliminated week 12)
Gaël (Eliminated week 11)
Elfy (Eliminated week 10)
Nicolas (Eliminated week 9)
David (Eliminated week 8)
Bastien (Eliminated week 7)
Judith (Eliminated week 6)
Faustine (Eliminated week 5)
Céline (Eliminated week 4)
Eloisha (Eliminated week 3
Fafa (Eliminated week 2)
Laurent (Eliminated week 1)

All of last year's profs returned this year including directrice Alexia Laroche-Joubert and dance teacher Kamel Ouali, the latter kept French fans guessing regarding his participation up to the last minute, as he remained involved in the popular musical Le Roi Soleil. Nikos Aliagas continued to present the daily updates and weekly "Prime" on Fridays.

The focus for this season was expected to shift from traditional songs to the "nouvelle chanson francaise" style made popular by singers like Benabar, Benjamin Biolay and former Star Ac 1 contestant Olivia Ruiz. Contestants Marina and Jean-Charles reflected this new musical style and Marina, in particular, was allowed to sing her own compositions on the "Prime".

Gael, whose musical style resembled that of the Gipsy Kings, eventually quit on 13 November, allegedly in relation to the refusal of the producers to allow him to record with the Gipsy Kings, whom his musical style clearly owed an allegiance to.  There was also controversy over remarks made by Raphaelle Ricci following the eviction of fan favourite Nicolas Charvillat, suggesting that her fellow "profs" had decided to evict him before he even sang a note.

In the end Cyril, the first black person to win Star Academy or any singing contest in France, triumphed by 67% of the vote over Dominique (33%) on 22 December to become the sixth Star Academy winner in France.

This year was unusual as only seven students went on the tour: Cyril, Dominique, Cynthia, Jean-Charles, Brice, Marina, and Ludovic.

Season 7
Contestants include
Quentin Mosimann (winner) (will also participate in the Tour)
Mathieu (finalist) (will also participate in the Tour)
Claire-Marie (semi-finalist) (will also participate in the Tour)
Bertrand (semi-finalist) (will also participate in the Tour)
Jéremy (will also participate in the Tour)
Lucie (will also participate in the Tour)
Pierre
Alexia
Sevan
Maureen
Antoine
Eva
Claudia
Noémie
Dojima
Yaëlle
Alexandra

Maureen, the favorite, walked after 7 weeks. Mathieu had been nominated 8 times over Star Academy 7, but each time was favored by the public to continue. Until finally, improving his show greatly, ending up in the final where Quentin, the favorite of most spectators with 0 nominations, won by the close margin of 52.6% to 47.4% for Mathieu.

Season 8 
The eighth season debuted on Friday September 19, 2008.

 The students are no longer in the chateau, but in a private hotel in the 3rd arrondissement of Paris, located at 12 rue Charlot

The contestants in season 8 are:

Top 2 (the finale aired on 19/12/08) -

Mickels Réa (winner)
Alice (runner-up)

Eliminated (in order of elimination) -

Laure Cappellini (eliminated on 26/09/08)
Gaëtan (eliminated on 3/10/08)
Ana Palomo-Diaz (eliminated on 10/10/08)
Julia Jean-Baptiste (eliminated on 17/10/08)
Harold Haven (eliminated on 24/10/08)
Yvane Beharry (voluntarily withdrew on 31/10/08)
Marilyne Lecomte (eliminated on 7/11/08)
Quentin LeMonnier (eliminated on 14/11/08)
Anissa Stili (eliminated on 21/11/08 - double elimination)
Édouard Privat (eliminated on 21/11/08 - double elimination)
Solène Le Pierres (eliminated on 28/11/08 - quarter-finalist)
Joanna Lagrave (eliminated on 05/12/08 - semi-finalist)
Gautier Riese (eliminated on 12/12/08 - semi-finalist)

Alice has been nominated the most times, with five; but was saved by the public each time, with an overwhelming majority above two other nominees. The series also saw a decline in the ratings, as in the premiere week, it has received 5.5 million viewers with 29.6% share (mainly from their competition, NCIS on M6). This was considerably down from the previous series' 7.1 million viewers (30.7% share).

Season 9 

NRJ 12 decided to reboot the show after TF1 cancelled it in 2008, due to declining ratings. It began airing again from December 2012.

Season 9 scholars:

 Daniel, 20, Eliminated - Feb 21 (2013) - Semi-finals versus Laurene  
 Nancy, 25, Eliminated - Jan 31 (2013) 
 Sidoine, 23, Eliminated - Feb 14 (2013) - Semi-finals versus Zayra 
 Romain, 25, Eliminated (quarter finals) - Feb 07 (2013) 
 Vanina, 23, Eliminated (quarter finals) - Feb 07 (2013)
 Tony, 23, Eliminated - Jan 17 (2013) 
 Mathilde, 20, Eliminated - Jan 10 (2013)
 Tad, 21, Eliminated - Dec. 20
 Jimmy, 25, Eliminated - Dec. 27
 Pauline, 18, Eliminated - Jan 24 (2013) 
 Zayra, 25, Eliminated - Feb 28 (2013) - Finals versus Laurene
 louis, 21, Eliminated - Jan 3 (2013)
 Laurene, 18 - Winner
 Manika, 22, Eliminated - Dec. 13
Laurene was nominated 2 times and Zayra only once. Zayra received the most number of marks in the history of 
Star academy, Zayra's and Star academy best mark was 19 out of 20.

Season 10
After a break of ten years from the concept and a fourteen-year break from broadcasting it themselves, TF1 announced a return to Star Academy in France. The premiere of the tenth season of the show took part on 15 October 2022 on TF1 with the contestants moving into the castle that same evening. Nikos Aliagas again took up hosting the show, while British singer Robbie Williams was named the godfather of the programme for this season. Michael Goldman is the show's headmaster. The show had a notable change in the amount of contestants as only thirteen solo acts took part. The 2005 Bob Sinclar song "Love Generation" has been used as a generic theme throughout the promotion of the new season. The contestants stay in the Dammarie-lès-Lys's Vives-Eaux castle, which was renovated during summer 2022.

Anisha won by a solid margin of 57% to 43% for Enola.

See also
List of French television series
Music of France

References

External links
Homepage of Star Academy 
Non official website of Star Academy in France and Lebanon 

Operación triunfo (Spanish original) on imdb

2001 French television series debuts
2008 French television series endings
2012 French television series debuts
2012 French television series endings
Star Academy
French music television series
French reality television series
French television series based on non-French television series
TF1 original programming
Television series by Banijay